The Taylor Correctional Institution is a state prison for men located in Perry, Taylor County, Florida, owned and operated by the Florida Department of Corrections.  

This facility has a mix of security levels, including minimum, medium, and close, and houses adult male offenders.  Taylor first opened in 1994 and has a maximum capacity of 1301 prisoners. 

The adjacent Taylor Annex opened in 2002 as a youth offender facility, then converted into a facility for adult males in 2005.  It has a maximum capacity of 1409 inmates.  

In 2014 two correctional officers were charged with multiple felonies for ordering a Taylor inmate, David Powell, to be killed.  Powell, who had threatened to expose the officers' lucrative smuggling operations, escaped two stabbings without serious injury.

References

Prisons in Florida
Buildings and structures in Taylor County, Florida
1994 establishments in Florida